The New Zealand Sires Stakes 3yo Final is an event for 3-year-old pacing horses in New Zealand. The race is one of the major harness races in New Zealand and is contested by the top three-year-old horses, who have to qualify in heats run throughout New Zealand in the preceding six weeks. 

Until 2021 it was run on the same day as the New Zealand Trotting Cup.

Records

Most wins by a driver:
 6 - Mark Purdon (1994, 2001, 2007, 2015, 2020, 2021)
 4 - Natalie Rasmussen (2016, 2017, 2018, 2019)
 3 - Anthony Butt (1995, 2004, 2008) 
 3 - Tony Herlihy (1991, 2002, 2006)
 3 - Maurice McKendry (1987, 1993, 2009)

Winners list

Other major races

 Auckland Trotting Cup 
 New Zealand Trotting Cup
 Great Northern Derby
 Rowe Cup
 Dominion Handicap
 Noel J Taylor Mile 
 Inter Dominion Pacing Championship
 Inter Dominion Trotting Championship
 Miracle Mile Pace

See also 
 Harness racing
 Harness racing in New Zealand

Reference list 

Harness racing in New Zealand
Horse races in New Zealand